Linda C. Lawson (born June 29, 1964) is an American politician and law enforcement officer who served as a member of the Indiana House of Representatives from 1998 until her retirement in 2018.

Career 
Lawson is a 24-year veteran of the Hammond Police Department. She became the first female captain to serve the department after working as a patrol officer and a member of the sex crimes and domestic violence divisions.

Lawson was chosen by Indiana House Democrats as their minority leader in a caucus on July 26, 2012. She became the first woman to head a Caucus in the Indiana House of Representatives. She was the minority leader until House Democrats met to choose new leadership following the November general election, selecting Scott Pelath.

In 2018, Lawson announced that she would not be running for reelection to the State House.

On May 8, 2020, Lawson was tapped as the running mate for Woody Myers in the 2020 Indiana gubernatorial election.

References

External links
State Representative Linda Lawson official Indiana State Legislature site

 

|-

1964 births
21st-century American politicians
21st-century American women politicians
American municipal police officers
American women police officers
Living people
Democratic Party members of the Indiana House of Representatives
Women state legislators in Indiana